Jimmy Burke is the name of:
James Burke (gangster) (1931–1996), Irish-American gangster
Jimmy Burke (baseball) (1874–1942), American baseball player

See also
Jim Burke (disambiguation)
James Burke (disambiguation)